Zhang Tao may refer to:
 Zhang Tao (Water Margin), character in Water Margin
 Zhang Tao (chemist) (born 1963), Chinese chemist